Jack Arnott (6 October 1920 – 13 August 1999) was  an Australian rules footballer who played with Collingwood in the Victorian Football League (VFL).

Notes

External links 

Profile on Collingwood Forever

1920 births
1999 deaths
Australian rules footballers from Victoria (Australia)
Collingwood Football Club players
People from Richmond, Victoria